Fatima Effendi is a Pakistani actress and model. She has appeared in the Pakistani drama series Man-O-Salwa, Meri Zaat Zarra-e-Benishan, Ishq Ibadat and Kash Mai Teri Beti Na Hoti.

Personal life 
Effendi was born in 1992 to a Muslim family in Karachi, Pakistan. Her mother Fouzia Mushtaq is also an actress. She has two sisters and a brother.

She married Kanwar Arsalan on 17 November 2012 in Karachi. They have two sons.

Career
Effendi is currently studying for a bachelor's degree in fashion design in Karachi.

She started her career as a child actress in 2001.

She also performed in Kash Mai Teri Beti Na Hoti with Kanwar Arsalan.

Filmography

Television

 Chal Jhooti PTV (2001)
 Daam-e-Rasai (PTV) (2001)
 Man-O-Salwa 
 Meri Unsuni Kahani (Hum TV) (2009)
 Sandal (Geo TV) (2009)
 Meri Zaat Zarra-e-Benishan 
 Massi Aur Malka (Geo TV)
 Gumshuda (PTV)
 Larkiyan Muhally Ki (Hum TV) (2010)
 Shehr-e-Dil Ke Darwazey (Ary Digital)
 Jeevay Jeevay Pakistan (TVOne)
 Baji (PTV)
 Aurat ka Ghar Konsa (PTV)
 Pul Siraat (ARY) (2011)
 Kuch Kami Si Hai (Geo TV)
 Ishq Ibadat
 Kash Mai Teri Beti Na Hoti 
 Extras (The Mango People) 
 Jiya Naa Jaye (Hum TV) (2013)
 Darbadar Tere Liye 
 Madventures Season 2 
 Takkabur 
 Joru Ka Ghulam
 Manjhdaar (also Known as Sitam) (Geo TV) (2016–17)
 Mera Aangan (Ary Digital)
 Champa Aur Chambeli 
Hamari Betiyaan
 Zindaan (ARY Digital) (2017)
 Love Mein Twist (2015)
 Aye Dil Tu Bata (2018)
 Paimanay (Urdu1) (2017)
 Munafiq
 Main Agar Chup Hoon
 Bechari Qudsia
 Guddu
 Betiyaan (ARY Digital)
Muqaddar Ka Sitara (ARY Digital)

Telefilms
 Dulha Bhai (Hum TV) (2008)
 Tum Se Kaise Kahoon (Hum TV) (2009)
 Raju Chacha Ban Gaey Gentleman]] (Hum TV) (2010)
 Chal Jhooti (Hum TV) (2010)
 Achay Ki Larki (Hum TV) (2010)
 Pappu Ki Paroson (Hum TV) (2011)
 Yeh Kon Sa Dayar Hai (Hum TV) (2011)
 Shaadi Ka Ladoo - Mera Teacher Mera Shauhar (Express Entertainment) (2011)
 Kattwi Chatt (ARY Digital) (2015)

References

External links
 

 1992 births
Pakistani television actresses
Pakistani female models
Actresses from Karachi
Living people
21st-century Pakistani actresses